Zavis of Falkenstein (– 24 August 1290), a member of the noble house of Vítkovci, was a Bohemian noble and opponent of King Ottokar II.

Biography 
Zavis was a scion of the Vítkovci lords of Krumlov, his father Budiwoj (d. after 1272) had married the Austrian noblewoman Perchta of Falkenstein. He entered the service of his mother's family as burgrave of Falkenstein Castle (in present-day Hofkirchen). 

Like many other Bohemian nobles he was concerned over the rise of the Přemyslid prince Ottokar II, son and heir of King Wenceslaus I of Bohemia, who in 1251 was installed as Austrian duke. Bohemian king from 1253, Ottokar founded the royal city of Budějovice (Budweis) and Zlatá Koruna Abbey to hinder further expansion of the Vítkovci domains; he also denied dynasty's entitlement to the Lordship of Velešín. However, his position was undermined when he entered into a fierce conflict with Count Rudolf of Habsburg, elected King of the Romans in 1273. Rudolf reclaimed the Austrian duchy and numerous other 'alienated' territories; when in 1276 he imposed an Imperial ban on Ottokar, several Bohemian nobles around Zavis took the occasion for open revolt. 

The insurgents pillaged Budějovice and Zlatá Koruna; Ottokar, facing revolt, had to enter into negotiations with Rudolf. He was forced to waive all acquisitions and retired to his Bohemian and Moravian hereditary lands. Although the Přemyslid king could suppress the Bohemian uprising with decisive action and forced Zavis to flee, Rudolf also demanded the restoration of the Vítkovci estates. The struggle continued until Ottokar was finally defeated by Rudolf's forces and killed in the 1278 Battle on the Marchfeld.

Upon the king's death, the Bohemian lands were ruled by the Ascanian margrave Otto of Brandenburg, acting as regent and guardian of Ottokar's minor son Wenceslaus II. Soon, however, new tensions arose with queen dowager Kunigunda and Margrave Otto had mother and son imprisoned at Bezděz Castle. Kunigunda was able to escape to Opava, where she allied with Zavis of Falkenstein, her late husband's enemy. She appointed him burgrave of Hradec and both possibly also began an affair. In turn, the margrave removed the heir to the throne out of the country to Spandau in Brandenburg where he was arrested until 1282.

As conditions in the princeless Bohemian kingdom worsened, the local nobles urged the return of Wenceslaus II. Finally, Otto of Brandenburg retired, not without collecting a considerable ransom and the confirmation of the Ascanian possessions in Upper Lusatia. Wenceslaus was released from custody and returned to Prague in 1283. 

Two years later, in 1285, Wenceslaus married Judith of Habsburg, daughter of King Rudolf. At the same time Zavis officially appeared as second husband of dowager queen Kunigunda. Once Otto of Brandenburg was expelled, he took his place at the head of local nobles along with Bishop Tobias Bechun of Prague, gained strong influence over the young king and manned important offices with his relatives and fellows. Given the situation at the Bohemian court, Rudolf took his daughter back to Austria after the wedding ceremony.
Zavis nepotism provoked the discontent of the Bohemian nobility and also the mistrust of Rudolf of Habsburg, after Wenceslaus refused to support the succession of his brother-in-law Albert, presumably under Zavis' influence. When Kunigunda died only a few months later in September 1285, Zavis proceeded to the court of King Ladislaus IV of Hungary, whose sister Elizabeth he married in 1287. 

The couple took residence at Svojanov Castle and Zavis again tried to gain influence on Bohemian politics. In turn, Rudolf of Habsburg finally guided his daughter Judith to the Prague throne and urged for measures taken against the usurper. The court requested the return of late Kunigunda's royal estates held by Zavis. When he refused he was accused of high treason and arrested in 1289. A revolt by his brothers failed and Zavis was executed on 24 August 1290 at Hluboká Castle. He was buried in the Vyšší Brod Monastery.

In art
He became the subject of Josef Richard Rozkošný's opera Záviš z Falkenštejna in 1877.

References

1290 deaths
Medieval Bohemian nobility
Year of birth uncertain